Trinidad is an impact crater on Mars.  It lies southeast of Tyrrhenus Mons on Hesperia Planum.

It was named by the IAU in 1991 after the town of Trinidad in Peru.

References 

Impact craters on Mars